Staunton River Battlefield State Park is a state park located in Virginia.  The park straddles the Staunton River in Halifax and Charlotte counties.   The Roanoke visitor center in Randolph, Virginia is a railroad depot which now holds exhibits on Native Americans and railroad history.  The Clover visitor center has exhibits on the American Civil War and the battle which took place on this site.  It also includes information about the production of electric energy.  The park also includes the Mulberry Hill plantation, given to the state in 1999.

Located in the park is the Wade Archeological Site.  It was listed on the National Register of Historic Places in 2003.  The Confederate fortifications at the bridge were listed in 2014.

See also
National Register of Historic Places listings in Halifax County, Virginia
 List of Virginia state parks
 List of Virginia state forests

References

External links
Park website
Historic Staunton River Foundation

State parks of Virginia
Railroad museums in Virginia
Museums in Charlotte County, Virginia
Native American museums in Virginia
American Civil War museums in Virginia
Museums in Halifax County, Virginia
Industry museums in Virginia
Parks in Charlotte County, Virginia
Archaeological sites on the National Register of Historic Places in Virginia
National Register of Historic Places in Charlotte County, Virginia